Phyllocnistis dorcas is a moth of the family Gracillariidae, known from Guyana. It was named by E. Meyrick in 1915.

References

Phyllocnistis
Endemic fauna of Guyana
Moths of South America